Leah Isadora Behn (born 8 April 2005) is a member of the Norwegian Royal family. She is the second daughter of Princess Märtha Louise of Norway and her late former husband Ari Behn, and a grandchild of King Harald V and Queen Sonja of Norway. She is the sixth in the line of succession to the Norwegian throne, after her sister Maud Angelica.

Although Leah and her sister are members of the royal family they are private citizens and are free to pursue other hobbies and interests more  than their titled cousins. 
Some of Leah's passions are modeling, photography, and makeup. She currently has her own YouTube channel as well as a TikTok page where she talks about her life and interests.

Life
The second daughter of Princess Märtha Louise, Leah Isadora was born at Bloksbjerg, her mother's summer residence on the island of Hankø, Norway.

On 16 June 2005, Leah was christened in the chapel of the Royal Palace, Oslo. Her godparents were Princess Laurentien of the Netherlands, her mother's friends Gry Brusletto and Katharina Salbu, her father's brother Espen Bjørshol, her father's friend Jon Andreas Håtun, and Didrik Vigsnæs, the husband of Princess Märtha Louise's bridesmaid and second cousin Marianne Ulrichsen. Leah's grandmother, Queen Sonja, carried her to the baptismal font. The christening made headlines around the world when Märtha Louise revealed that the name Leah had been inspired by the Star Wars character Princess Leia. She said in an interview with the newspaper Aftenposten, "I must admit that I have always been a big 'Star Wars' fan, and Princess Leia has always been the most beautiful in the whole world".

Leah has an older sister, Maud Angelica, and a younger one, Emma Tallulah. The family lived in Islington, London, then in New York, and finally in Lommedalen, a valley outside Oslo.

On 5 August 2016, Leah’s parents started divorce proceedings, intending to share custody of their daughters, and the divorce was finalized in 2017. Ari Behn died by suicide on Christmas Day, 2019. His funeral service was held in Oslo Cathedral. In April 2021, Princess Märtha Louise revealed that she was planning to move to the United States with her daughters when the problems of COVID-19 were out of the way.

References

External links
 Official website of The Royal House of Norway

2005 births
Living people
Norwegian children
Norwegian people of German descent
Norwegian people of Danish descent
Norwegian people of English descent
Norwegian people of Swedish descent